The Paradise is an IBA official cocktail, and is classified as a "pre-dinner" drink, an apéritif.

The earliest known in-print recipe for the Paradise Cocktail was written by Harry Craddock in 1930. This cocktail is prepared using gin, apricot brandy (apricot liqueur), and orange juice in a 2:1:1 ratio, with a splash of lemon juice.

In popular culture
The Paradise cocktail plays a key part in the 1932 Warner Bros. romantic film One Way Passage as the drink of the two star-crossed lovers played by Kay Francis and William Powell.

On May 27, 2018, Snoop Dogg set the world record for the largest "Gin and Juice", a 500-litre (132 gallon) paradise cocktail that contained 180 bottles of gin, 154 bottles of apricot brandy, and 144 liters (38 gallons) of orange juice.

See also
 List of cocktails

References

Cocktails with gin